Barisal City Corporation is a self-governed municipal administration in Bangladesh that administers and oversees development and maintenance works in the city of Barisal. The corporation covers an area of over 58 square kilometers in the Barisal district where over five million people live as permanent residents. The body was known as Barisal Municipality previously, until it obtained the City Corporation status by a ministry of local government declaration on 25 July 2002.

History
To provide civil service and facilities to the inhabitants, Barisal Town Committee was formed in 1969 under Act VI of 1868 (B.C.) with the District Magistrate as its Chairman. J. C Price was the first Chairman of the Town Committee. It was upgraded to Barisal municipality in 1876 under the Manicipal Act of 1876.
It was then managed by a Committee, of which the District Magistrate was president, and was aided by Government with establishment grants. It remained as a municipality for over 130 years though the number of population have been rising with time. Later in 2001, the ministry of local government meeting on declared to turn two divisional headquarter, Barisal and Sylhet to City Corporations and passed "Barisal City Corporation Act, 2001". An administrative move was made abolishing the Barisal Municipality as the final step to introduce the administrative body as a city corporation. Later on 25 July 2002, the municipality was officially upgraded as Barisal City Corporation.

List of officeholders

The Mayor of Barisal City is head of the Barisal City Corporation. The mayor's office is located in Nagar Bhabon. It has jurisdiction over all thirty wards of the city, administers all city services, public property, most public agencies, and enforces all city and state laws within the city.

Deputy mayors
The mayor of Barisal City may appoint several deputy mayors to assist him and to oversee major offices within the executive branch of the city government.
The current deputy mayors are: Gazi Noimul Hossain Litu (Panel Mayor-1) and Rafiqul Islam Khokon (Panel Mayor-2).

Elections

Election result 2018

Election result 2013

Administration 
The city corporation is run by a joint staff of elected public representatives and government officials. Officials both come from departmental recruitment and the administrative cadre service of the country. The area of BCC is divided into 4 thanas: Kotwali, Kawnia, Bandar and Airport. The thanas are subdivided into 3j0 wards and 225 mahallas. It is administrated by 30 councilors, 9 woman councilors and the mayor elected by the local government election which sits in the office for a five-year tenure.

Services 
The Barisal City Corporation is responsible for administering and providing basic infrastructure to the city.
 Water purification and supply
 Sewage treatment and disposal
 Garbage disposal and street cleanliness
 Solid waste management
 Building and maintenance of roads and streets.
 Street lighting
 Maintenance of parks and open spaces
 Cemeteries and Crematoriums
 Registering of births and deaths
 Conservation of heritage sites
 Disease control, including immunization
 Public municipal schools  etc.

See also 
 List of city corporations in Bangladesh
 Barisal Division

Notes

  Ahsan Habib Kamal served as acting mayor from when Barisal City Corporation was created until the first city election could be held.
  Awlad Hossain Dilu served as acting mayor while Sarwar was under arrest.

References

External links 
 Barisal City Corporation on Banglapedia

Barisal
City Corporations of Bangladesh